The 2019 UNAF U-18 Tournament was the 11th edition of the UNAF U-20 Tournament which was apparently changed from U-20 to U-18 in 2017. The tournament took place in Alexandria, Egypt, from 4 to 14 April 2019.

Participants

 

 
 

Withrawed teams

Venues

Squads

Tournament

Goalscorers
6 goals
 Achraf Gharib

4 goals
 Mostafa Kandoro Hames

3 goals
 Mohamed Boukerma

1 goal

 Lotfi Aouane
 Khalil Bara
 Mohamed Islam Belkheir
 Moncef Bekrar
 Belkacem Bouzidad
 Marouane Droufi
 Ahmed Mesaad Kamal
 Mahmoud Saber Abdel Mohsen
 Ibrahim Adel Ali Mohamed
 Ahmed Eid Mohamed
 Ikinu Izaye Apoel
 Mashika Kivington
 Mathew Mwendwa
 Ayman Ouhatti
 Husein Ali Misungui

Awards
Fairplay team

References

External links
الاسكندرية تحتضن من 4 الى 14 افريل دورة اتحاد شمال افريقيا تحت 18 عاما - UNAF official website

2019 in African football
2019
2019